All Saints, King City is a parish of the Anglican Church of Canada in the Diocese of Toronto, Ecclesiastical Province of Ontario. It was established in 1857 in Springhill, now known as King City. The facility was originally built of pine cleared from the site, and was covered with brick in 1871. In 1960, the building was extended with the addition of the parish hall.

Weekly services are held on Sundays at 08:00 and 10:30, with nursery care and Sunday School provided at 10:30 am. Its current clergy is the Rev.Canon Erin Martin

References

External links
All Saints, King City

Anglican church buildings in Ontario
King, Ontario